Irvin Stewart (October 27, 1899 – December 24, 1990) was an American administrator who served as a Commissioner of the Federal Communications Commission from 1934 to 1937 and as the President of West Virginia University from 1946 to 1958.

He died of a stroke on December 24, 1990, in Washington, D.C. at age 91.

References

1899 births
1990 deaths
Members of the Federal Communications Commission
Presidents of West Virginia University
Texas Democrats
Franklin D. Roosevelt administration personnel